Sir Joseph Bernard Dawson  (8 April 1883 – 17 August 1965) was a New Zealand gynaecologist. He was born in Erdington, Warwickshire, England, on 8 April 1883.

In the 1948 New Year Honours, Dawson was appointed a Knight Commander of the Order of the British Empire.

References

1883 births
1965 deaths
English emigrants to New Zealand
New Zealand gynaecologists
New Zealand Knights Commander of the Order of the British Empire